Ross Peter Gload (born April 5, 1976) is an American former professional baseball first baseman and outfielder. He played in Major League Baseball (MLB) for six teams over ten seasons.

High school/college career
Gload grew up in the Long Island community of Springs, New York, where he broke numerous high school and county home run records. After his record-breaking 1994 season for East Hampton High School, Gload was honored with the "Carl Yastrzemski Award," which is annually awarded to the most outstanding high school baseball player in Suffolk County by the Suffolk County Baseball Coaches Association. His 41 career home runs, and 20 in the 1994 season alone, are New York state high school records.  Perhaps his most memorable high school moment was the Suffolk County Championship game, where he single-handedly propelled East Hampton to the Long Island Championship with four moonshots off of Kings Park High School's left-handed starter Matthew Ligouri.

Gload attended the University of South Florida, where he played under longtime Coach Eddie Cardieri. In 1995 and 1996, he played collegiate summer baseball with the Hyannis Mets of the Cape Cod Baseball League and was named a league all-star in 1996. He is a member of the USF Athletic Hall of Fame.

Major league career

Chicago Cubs

Gload was selected in the 13th round of the  amateur draft by the Florida Marlins. On July 31, 2000, at the trade deadline, he was dealt to the Chicago Cubs along with minor leaguer Dave Noyce for Henry Rodriguez.  Gload made his Major League debut August 31,  with the Cubs.  On September 12, 2001, he was claimed on waivers by the Colorado Rockies but did not play in any big league games that season.

New York Mets/Colorado Rockies

In January , Gload was involved in two deals with the New York Mets in a span of six days, first moving to the Mets in a three-team, 11-player trade, then having his contract purchased by Colorado from the Mets.  Gload batted .258 with a home run and four RBIs in limited action with the Rockies.

Chicago White Sox

Just before the  season, Gload moved on to the Chicago White Sox organization, being acquired by Chicago for minor leaguer Wade Parrish. He batted .321 in 2004 with seven homers and 44 RBIs, finishing seventh in the American League Rookie of the Year voting. In 2006, his numbers were .327 with three homers and 18 RBIs in fewer at-bats. He won his first World Series ring with the White Sox in 2005

Kansas City Royals

On December 16, 2006, Gload was traded to the Kansas City Royals for relief pitcher 
Andrew Sisco. In , with Kansas City, Gload logged career highs in at-bats and RBIs, being used as a starter more than in the past. He batted .288 with seven homers and 51 RBIs in 102 games.

During the 2007–2008 offseason, Gload signed a two-year Major League contract with Kansas City.

Florida Marlins

On April 1, 2009, Gload was traded to the Florida Marlins for a player to be named later. Gload's batting entrance song is Harvester of Sorrow by Metallica.

On May 22, 2009 Gload made his pitching debut, pitching a scoreless ninth inning versus the Tampa Bay Rays. He and Wes Helms set an MLB record for most pinch-hits by a duo.

Philadelphia Phillies

On December 15, 2009, Gload signed a 2-year, $2.6 million contract with the Philadelphia Phillies.  In 2012, Gload's contract with the Phillies expired, making him a free agent.

References

External links

Chicago Cubs players
Chicago White Sox players
Colorado Rockies players
Kansas City Royals players
Florida Marlins players
Philadelphia Phillies players
Major League Baseball first basemen
Charlotte Knights players
1976 births
Living people
South Florida Bulls baseball players
Sportspeople from Brooklyn
Baseball players from New York City
Sportspeople from Suffolk County, New York
Hyannis Harbor Hawks players
Utica Blue Sox players
Kane County Cougars players
Brevard County Manatees players
Portland Sea Dogs players
Iowa Cubs players
Colorado Springs Sky Sox players
Omaha Royals players
Clearwater Threshers players
People from Springs, New York
East Hampton High School alumni